Binibining Pilipinas 1999 was the 36th edition of Binibining Pilipinas. it took place at the Smart Araneta Coliseum in Quezon City, Metro Manila, Philippines on February 20, 1999.
 
At the end of the event, Jewel May Lobaton crowned Janelle Bautista as Binibining Pilipinas Universe 1999, Rachel Soriano crowned Miriam Quiambao as Binibining Pilipinas World 1999, while Colette Centeno crowned Lalaine Edson as Binibining Pilipinas International 1999. Michelle Arcangel was named First Runner-Up, while Joelle Marie Pelaez was named Second Runner-Up.

More than a month after the pageant, Janelle Bautista voluntarily relinquished her title due to a defective passport and citizenship issues and was replaced by Miriam Quiambao as Binibining Pilipinas Universe 1999. Lalaine Edson assumed the title of Binibining Pilipinas World 1999, while Georgina Sandico, one of the 10 semi-finalists, was appointed as Binibining Pilipinas International 1999.

Results
 
Color keys
  The contestant was a Runner-up in an International pageant.
  The contestant did not place.

Special Awards

Board of Judges 
 Carlos A. Arellano – Chairman & President, Social Security System
 JV Ejercito – Jaycees' National President
 Martin L. Fernandez – General Marketing Manager, Nokia
 Dieter J. Lonishen – President & managing director, Bayer Philippines
 Marixi Prieto – Chairman of the board, Philippine Daily Inquirer
 Asi Taulava – Professional basketball player
 Michelle Van Eimeren – 1994 Miss Australia
 Alice Lee – National Director, Malaysia/Singapore Pageant Production
 Jaime Dichaves – Vice President for Luzon Basketball Association of the Philippines

Contestants
30 contestants competed for the three titles.

Notes

Post-pageant Notes 

 After being elevated as Binibining Pilipinas-Universe 1999, Miriam Quiambao competed at the Miss Universe 1999 pageant in Chaguaramas, Trinidad and Tobago, and was named First Runner-Up. Quiambao also won the Clairol Herbal Essence Style Award. Lalaine Edson and Georgina Sandico where also elevated as Binibining Pilipinas-World1999 and Binibining Pilipinas-International 1999, respectively.
 Lalaine Edson competed at Miss World 1999 in London and was unplaced. Georgina Sandico was also unplaced when she competed at the Miss International 1999 pageant in Tokyo, Japan. After her stint at Miss World, Edson never came back to crown her successor and has since stayed in London as a model.
 Jamine Esperat and Joanna Rafbel Serrano competed again at Binibining Pilipinas 2000 and Binibining Pilipinas 2005, respectively. Esperat was unplaced when she competed in 2000, and Serrano was a semifinalist when she competed in 2005.

References

 
1999
1999 beauty pageants